Mario Antonio Monge Paredes  (born 27 November 1938) was a footballer from El Salvador who played as a forward.

Club career
Monge played for two of the "Big Four" of Salvadoran football, FAS and Alianza.

International career
Monge has represented his country in six FIFA World Cup qualification matches and played two matches at the 1970 FIFA World Cup Finals.

Honours
Primera División de Fútbol de El Salvador: 2
 1966, 1967

References

External links

1938 births
Living people
Sportspeople from San Salvador
Association football forwards
Salvadoran footballers
Salvadoran expatriate footballers
El Salvador international footballers
1970 FIFA World Cup players
Expatriate soccer players in Canada
Salvadoran expatriate sportspeople in Canada 
Eastern Canada Professional Soccer League players
Toronto Italia players
Once Municipal footballers
C.D. FAS footballers
Alianza F.C. footballers
Salvadoran football managers